Eric Monjonell Torras (born 16 December 2001) is a Spanish footballer who plays as a central defender for Belgian club Lommel S.K., on loan from Girona FC.

Club career
Born in Sant Antoni de Vilamajor, Barcelona, Catalonia, Monjonell represented FC Argentona, CF Badalona, CE Mataró and Girona FC as a youth. In June 2020, after finishing his formation, he was promoted to the latter's B-team in Tercera División.

Monjonell made his senior debut on 18 October 2020, starting in a 3–0 away win against UE Figueres. He made his first team debut on 4 November, coming on as a late substitute for fellow youth graduate Gerard Gumbau in a 2–2 Segunda División away draw against Real Zaragoza.

On 31 August 2022, Monjonell renewed his contract until 2025 and was immediately loaned to Belgian side Lommel S.K. for the season.

References

External links

2001 births
Living people
People from Vallès Oriental
Sportspeople from the Province of Barcelona
Spanish footballers
Footballers from Catalonia
Association football defenders
Segunda División players
Tercera División players
Tercera Federación players
Girona FC B players
Girona FC players
Lommel S.K. players
Spanish expatriate footballers
Spanish expatriate sportspeople in Belgium
Expatriate footballers in Belgium